Vahid Amiri  (born 2 April 1988) is an Iranian professional footballer who plays mainly as a winger for Persian Gulf Pro League club Persepolis and Iran national team.

Amiri represented the Iran at the 2015 and 2019 AFC Asian Cups and also the 2018 FIFA World Cup. He predominantly plays as a left winger but can play in all attacking positions.

Club career
Amiri started his career with Datis Lorestan. He left Gahar Zagros in the summer of 2011 and Naft Masjed Soleyman and spent two seasons with them.

Naft Tehran
In May 2013 he joined Naft Tehran with a two-year contract. Amiri scored his first goal for Naft on 6 August 2013 in a 1–1 draw against Damash Gilan. He scored his first Asian Champions League on 7 April 2015 in a 3–0 away win against Saudi club Al-Shabab. Amiri scored on 16 September 2015 in a 2–1 loss to Al-Ahli Dubai in the quarter–finals of the Asian Champions League.

Persepolis 
Amiri joined Persepolis in summer of 2016 with a two years contract. He won two league with Persepolis and was named Iranian Footballer of the Year in 2018. He played 74 games and scored 9 goals for his team.

Trabzonspor
On 21 July 2018, Amiri agreed to a two-year contract with Turkish Giants Trabzonspor.

Persepolis 

On 13 July 2019, Amiri signed a two-year contract with Persian Gulf Pro League champions Persepolis. After returning to Persepolis, He said:I am very happy to return to Persepolis once again. I had several offers from the other Iranian teams but I opted to return to my home.Also clubs No. 19 was given to Amiri.

International career
He was called into Iran's 2015 AFC Asian Cup squad on 30 December 2014 by Carlos Queiroz. He made his debut on a friendly against Iraq on 4 January 2015. He missed a decisive penalty against Iraq which lead to elimination of Iran from Asian Cup 2015. Amiri scored his first international goal in a 2–0 victory against Chile.

In May 2018 he was named in Iran's preliminary squad for the 2018 FIFA World Cup in Russia.

Personal life
Amiri was born in the small village of Darreh-ye Badam in Khorramabad, Lorestan Province. He has a degree in law and as of January 2016 is studying for his master's degree in Physical Education.

Career statistics

Club

International

Scores and results list Iran's goal tally first, score column indicates score after each Amiri goal.

Honours
Naft Tehran
Hazfi Cup runner-up: 2014–15

Persepolis
Persian Gulf Pro League: 2016–17, 2017–18, 2019–20, 2020–21
Iranian Super Cup: 2017, 2018, 2020; runner-Up: 2021
AFC Champions League runner-up: 2020

Individual
Persian Gulf Pro League Team of the Year: 2016–17, 2017–18
Iranian Footballer of the Year: 2018

References

External links

Vahid Amiri at FFIRI.ir
Vahid Amiri at IranLeague.ir

1988 births
Living people
People from Khorramabad
Iranian footballers
Gahar Zagros players
Naft Masjed Soleyman F.C. players
Naft Tehran F.C. players
Persepolis F.C. players
Trabzonspor footballers
Azadegan League players
Persian Gulf Pro League players
Süper Lig players
Iranian expatriate footballers
Expatriate footballers in Turkey
Iranian expatriate sportspeople in Turkey
2015 AFC Asian Cup players
Iran international footballers
Association football wingers
2018 FIFA World Cup players
2019 AFC Asian Cup players
2022 FIFA World Cup players